Wubana is a genus of American sheet weavers that was first described by Ralph Vary Chamberlin in 1919.

Species
 it contains seven species, found only in the United States:
Wubana atypica Chamberlin & Ivie, 1936 – USA
Wubana drassoides (Emerton, 1882) (type) – USA
Wubana ornata Chamberlin & Ivie, 1936 – USA
Wubana pacifica (Banks, 1896) – USA
Wubana reminiscens Chamberlin, 1949 – USA
Wubana suprema Chamberlin & Ivie, 1936 – USA
Wubana utahana Chamberlin & Ivie, 1936 – USA

See also
 List of Linyphiidae species (Q–Z)

References

Araneomorphae genera
Linyphiidae
Spiders of the United States